Girraween may refer to:
Girraween, New South Wales
Girraween, Northern Territory
Girraween National Park in Queensland

See also
Girrawheen, Western Australia